The following lists events that happened during 2013 in Bahrain.

Incumbents
 Monarch: Hamad ibn Isa Al Khalifa
 Prime Minister: Khalifa bin Salman Al Khalifa

Events

January
 January 11 - A fire sweeps through a complex containing housing for foreign workers in Manama leaving 13 foreign nationals dead.

February
 February 14 - Bahraini uprising (2011–present)
 A 16-year-old is shot dead at close range in Al-Daih, a village west of Manama.
 A police officer is also killed after rioters threw firebombs at his patrol in Sehla, a village west of Manama.
 Amnesty International calls on the Bahraini regime to release prisoners of conscience it is holding in captivity.

August
 August 14 - Bahrain police fire tear gas to disperse protesters in response by activist for pro-democracy demonstrations.

October
 October 23 - A teenager in Bahrain dies following an explosion in the village of Bani Jamra, east of the capital Manama.

References

 
2010s in Bahrain
Years of the 21st century in Bahrain
Bahrain
Bahrain